Samina Mushtaq Pagganwala is a Pakistani politician who served as member of the National Assembly of Pakistan.

Political career
She was elected to the National Assembly of Pakistan as a candidate of Pakistan Peoples Party on a seat reserved for women from Punjab in the 2008 Pakistani general election. In 2011, she was appointed parliamentary secretary for Kashmir affairs and Gilgit-Baltistan.

References

Date of birth missing (living people)
Living people
Pakistani MNAs 2008–2013
Year of birth missing (living people)